Martin Podlešák (born September 26, 1982) is a Czech former professional ice hockey player. He was originally selected by the Phoenix Coyotes in the 2nd round (45th overall) of the 2001 NHL Entry Draft.

Podlešák played with HC České Budějovice in the Czech Extraliga during the 2010–11 Czech Extraliga season. He previously played for HC Sparta Praha, Lethbridge Hurricanes, Springfield Falcons, Utah Grizzlies and San Antonio Rampage.

On August 4, 2014, Podlešák signed a one-year contract with the Nottingham Panthers of the Elite Ice Hockey League, however left the club without making his debut, due to a family bereavement, to return to the Czech Republic on September 2, 2014.

Career statistics

Regular season and playoffs

International

References

External links

1982 births
Living people
Arizona Coyotes draft picks
Motor České Budějovice players
Czech ice hockey centres
Lethbridge Hurricanes players
People from Mělník
San Antonio Rampage players
HC Sparta Praha players
Springfield Falcons players
Tri-City Americans players
Utah Grizzlies (AHL) players
Sportspeople from the Central Bohemian Region
Czech expatriate ice hockey players in Canada
Czech expatriate ice hockey players in the United States
Stadion Hradec Králové players